The Union of European Football Associations (UEFA) is the administrative and controlling body for European football. It consists of 55 member associations, each of which is responsible for governing football in their respective countries.

All widely recognised sovereign states located entirely within Europe are members, with the exceptions of the United Kingdom, Monaco and Vatican City. Eight states partially or entirely outside Europe are also members: Armenia, Azerbaijan, Cyprus, Georgia, Israel, Kazakhstan, Russia and Turkey. The United Kingdom is divided into the four separate football associations of England, Northern Ireland, Scotland, and Wales; each association has a separate UEFA membership. The Faroe Islands, an autonomous country of the Kingdom of Denmark, also has its own football association which is a member of UEFA. The football association of Gibraltar, a British Overseas Territory, was approved as a member by UEFA in 2013. Kosovo was approved as a member in 2016, even though it is claimed by Serbia and is not recognised by several other UEFA member states.

Each UEFA member has its own football league system, except Liechtenstein. Clubs playing in each top-level league compete for the title as the country's club champions. Clubs also compete in the league and national cup competitions for places in the following season's UEFA club competitions, the UEFA Champions League, UEFA Europa League and UEFA Europa Conference League. Due to promotion and relegation, the clubs playing in the top-level league are different every season, except in San Marino and Gibraltar where there is only one level.

Some clubs play in a national football league other than their own country's. Where this is the case, the club is noted as such.

UEFA coefficients

The UEFA league coefficients, also known as the UEFA rankings, are used to rank the leagues of Europe, and thus determine the number of clubs from a league that will participate in UEFA Champions League and UEFA Europa League. A country's ranking determines the number of teams competing in the season after the next; the 2009 rankings determined qualification for European competitions in the 2010–11 season.

A country's ranking is calculated based on the results of its clubs in UEFA competitions over the past five seasons. Two points are awarded for each win by a club, and one for a draw. If a game goes to extra time, the result at the end of time is used to calculate ranking points; if the match goes to a penalty shootout, it is considered to be a draw for the purposes of the coefficient system. The number of points awarded to a country's clubs are added together, and then divided by the number of clubs that participated in European competitions that season. This number is then rounded to three decimal places; two and two-thirds would become 2.667.

For the league coefficient the season's league coefficients for the last five seasons must be added up. In the preliminary rounds of both the Champions League and Europa League, the awarded points are halved. Bonus points for certain achievements are added to the number of points scored in a season. Bonus points are allocated for:

Qualifying for the Champions League group phase. (4 bonus points)
Reaching the second round of the Champions League. (5 bonus points)
Reaching the quarter, semi and final of both Champions League and Europa League. (1 bonus point)

Full list by country

Albania 

 Football association: Football Association of Albania
 Top-level league: Albanian Superliga
 UEFA ranking: 42nd
 Soccerway profile: here

The top division of Albanian football was formed in 1930, and the inaugural title was won by SK Tirana (now known as KF Tirana). Tirana are the most successful team in the league's history, having won the competition on 24 occasions, followed by FK Dinamo Tirana (now playing in the second division) with 18 championships, and Partizani with 16. The league became affiliated with UEFA in 1954. Since the 2014–15 season, 10 teams compete in the division. The teams finishing in the bottom two places are relegated to the Albanian First Division and are replaced by the champions of each of that league's two groups.

Clubs and locations as of 2021-22 season:

Andorra

 Country: Andorra
 Football association: Andorran Football Federation
 Top-level league: Andorran First Division
 UEFA ranking: 54th
 Soccerway profile: here

Andorra's national league system was formed in 1993, and the Andorran Football Federation gained UEFA membership in 1996. Records from the league's first three seasons are incomplete, but FC Santa Coloma have won more First Division titles than any other team, with at least 13.
Another Andorran football club, FC Andorra, play in the Spanish football league system. In recent years, eight teams have competed in the First Division. Each team plays two matches against the other seven clubs. After fourteen games, the league splits into two groups, with teams carrying their previous points totals forward. The top four teams play each other a further two times in the championship round to decide 1st–4th places, while the bottom four teams do likewise in the relegation round, to determine the 5th–8th positions. At the end of the season, the bottom-placed team is relegated, while the seventh-placed team plays a two-legged play-off against the second-placed team in the Second Division to decide which team plays in which division for the following season.

Clubs and locations as of 2021–22 season:

Armenia

 Country: Armenia
 Football association: Football Federation of Armenia
 Top-level league: Armenian Premier League
 UEFA Ranking: 43rd
 Soccerway profile: here

Armenia gained independence in 1991, following the break-up of the Soviet Union. Organised football had been played in Armenia since 1936, as part of the Soviet football system. The Football Federation of Armenia gained UEFA affiliation in 1992, and the league ran as the national championship for the first time in the same year. Since independence, the country's most successful team is Pyunik, who has won 14 league titles.

Clubs and locations as of 2021-22 season:

Austria

 Country: Austria
 Football association: Austrian Football Association
 Top-level league: Austrian Football Bundesliga
 UEFA ranking: 12th
 Soccerway profile: here

Clubs and locations as of 2021-22 season:

Azerbaijan

 Country: Azerbaijan
 Football association: Association of Football Federations of Azerbaijan
 Top-level league: Azerbaijan Premier League
 UEFA ranking: 26th
 Soccerway profile: here

Although the country was part of the Soviet Union, the first Azerbaijan-wide football competition took place in 1928, and became an annual occurrence from 1934. Following the break-up of the Soviet Union in 1991, the first independent Azeri championship took place in 1992, and the Association of Football Federations of Azerbaijan gained UEFA affiliation in 1994 Since independence, the country's most successful team is Neftçi Baku, with eight league titles. In recent years, 10 teams had competed in the Azerbaijan Premier League, but two teams that otherwise would have competed in the 2016–17 season were denied professional licenses, making it an eight-team league at present.

Clubs and locations as of 2021-22 season:

Belarus

 Country: Belarus
 Football association: Football Federation of Belarus
 Top-level league: Belarusian Premier League
 UEFA ranking: 32nd
 Soccerway profile: here

Belarus declared independence from the Soviet Union in 1990. Its independence was widely recognised within Europe in 1991, an independent national championship began in 1992, and UEFA membership followed in 1993. Through the 2018 season, the most successful team is BATE Borisov, with 15 league championships, including an ongoing streak of 13 titles. The 2016 season saw the league expand from 14 teams to 16, accomplished by promoting three clubs from the Belarusian First League and relegating only the last-place team in the 2015 Premier League. At the end of the season, the bottom two teams are relegated to the First League and replaced by that league's top two finishers.

Clubs and locations as of 2021 season:

Belgium

 Country: Belgium
 Football association: Royal Belgian Football Association
 Top-level league: Belgian First Division A
 UEFA ranking: 9th
 Soccerway profile: here

Organised football reached Belgium in the 19th century; the Royal Belgian Football Association was founded in 1895, and FC Liégeois became the country's first champions the following year. Belgium joined European football's governing body, UEFA, upon its formation in 1954. Historically the country's most successful team are Anderlecht, with 34 league titles as of 2019. The Belgian First Division A, historically known as the First Division and also known as the Pro League from 2008 to 2009 through 2015–16, currently consists of 16 teams. Initially, each team plays the other clubs twice for a total of 30 matches. At this point, the league proceeds as follows (as of the current 2016–17 season):
 The top six teams take half of their points (rounded up) into a championship play-off, playing each other two further times to determine the national champion.
 The teams finishing the regular season between 7th and 15th enter one of two six-team groups. The remaining teams in this competition are the top three teams from the Belgian First Division B (historically known as the Second Division), excluding that division's champion (which earns automatic promotion to First Division A). Each team plays the other five teams in its group home and away, and the winners of each group play one another in a two-legged play-off. The winner of that match advances to a two-legged play-off against the fourth- or fifth-place team (depending on results) from the championship play-off for the country's final UEFA Europa League place for the following season.
 The bottom team on the regular-season table is automatically relegated to First Division B.

Clubs and locations as of 2021-22 season:

Bosnia and Herzegovina

 Country: Bosnia and Herzegovina
 Football association: Football Association of Bosnia and Herzegovina
 Top-level league: Premier League of Bosnia and Herzegovina
 UEFA ranking: 35th
 Soccerway profile: here

Prior to gaining independence from Yugoslavia, clubs from Bosnia and Herzegovina were eligible to compete in the Yugoslav First League, which they won three times. The country gained independence in 1992, and its Football Association gained UEFA membership in 1998. Due to political tensions between Bosniaks, Bosnian Serbs and Bosnian Croats, the country did not have a single national top division until the 2002–03 season, but rather two or three. Since then, Zrinjski Mostar have won six titles, Sarajevo have won four, Željezničar have won three, Široki Brijeg have won twice and three other teams have won it once each.

Since the 2016–17 season, the Premier League has consisted of 12 clubs, reduced from 16 in previous seasons. The 2016–17 season was the first for a two-stage season. In the first stage, each team played all others home and away, after which the league split into two six-team groups that also played home and away. The top six teams played for the championship and European qualifying places; the bottom six played to avoid relegation. At the end of the second stage, the bottom two clubs of the relegation group dropped to either the First League of the Federation of Bosnia and Herzegovina or the First League of the Republika Srpska. Since the 2018–19 season, the league is not played as the one in the 2016–17 season. Actually very simple, after all the 12 clubs play each other two times, once home and once away, they play each other three times, also playing home or away depending on how the schedule is made. With that, the league season has 33 full rounds instead of the 22 rounds and an additional 10 rounds in the relegation and championship games.

Clubs and locations as of 2021-22 season:

Bulgaria

 Country: Bulgaria
 Football association: Bulgarian Football Union
 Top-level league: First Professional Football League (short form "Parva Liga" [Първа лига])
 UEFA ranking: 24th
 Soccerway profile: here

A national Bulgarian championship has been held in every year since 1924, although the 1924, 1927 and 1944 seasons were not completed. The country gained UEFA membership in 1954. Historically, the most successful teams in Bulgarian football have been CSKA Sofia and Levski Sofia; no other team has won more than ten league titles. In recent years, Ludogorets Razgrad has dominated the league; although the team did not make its first appearance in the top flight until 2011–12, it has won the championship in each of its first eight seasons at that level. The 2015–16 season was intended to have 12 teams, but was reduced to 10 after four clubs (the two clubs that would otherwise have been promoted to what was then known as the A Group, plus two from the previous season's A Group) were denied professional licenses. Following that season, the Bulgarian Football Union revamped the country's professional league structure, expanding the top flight to 14 teams and changing that league's name from "A Group" to "First League".

Under the current structure that began in 2016–17, each team plays the others twice, once at each club's stadium. At the end of the season the league splits into separate playoffs, with table points and statistics carrying over in full. The top six teams enter a championship playoff, with each team playing the others home and away. The top finisher is league champion and enters the UEFA Champions League; the second-place team earns a place in the UEFA Europa League; and the third-place team (or fourth-place team, should the winner of that season's Bulgarian Cup finish in the top three) advances to a playoff for the country's final Europa League place. The bottom eight split into two four-team groups, playing home and away within each group. The top two teams from each group enter a knockout playoff consisting of two-legged matches (note, however, that if one of these four teams is the Bulgarian Cup winner, it is withdrawn from the playoff and its opponent receives a bye into the final). The winner of this playoff then plays the third-place team in a one-off match for the final Europa League place. The bottom two clubs from each group enter an identical knockout playoff. The winner remains in the First League; the other three teams face a series of relegation playoffs that also include the second- and third-place clubs from the Second League, with places for only two of these five teams in the next season's First League.

Clubs and locations as of 2021-22 season:

Croatia

 Country: Croatia
 Football association: Croatian Football Federation
 Top-level league: Croatian First Football League
 UEFA ranking: 15th
 Soccerway profile: here

National Croatian leagues were organised in 1914 and during the Second World War, but during peacetime Croatia's biggest clubs competed in the Yugoslav First League. After Croatia declared independence from Yugoslavia in 1991, a national football league was formed in 1992, and the Croatian Football Federation gained UEFA membership in 1993. Since its formation, the Croatian First League has been dominated by Dinamo Zagreb and Hajduk Split; as of the end of the 2018–19 season, one of these teams has won the title in all but two of the league's 28 seasons. Since the 2013–14 season, the First League has consisted of 10 teams. At the end of the season, the 10th-placed team is relegated directly to the second division, while the 9th-placed team enters a relegation play-off.

Clubs and locations as of 2021-22 season:

Cyprus

 Country: Cyprus
 Football association: Cyprus Football Association
 Top-level league: Cypriot First Division
 UEFA ranking: 16th
 Soccerway profile: here

Clubs and locations as of 2019–20 season:

Czech Republic

 Country: Czech Republic
 Football association: Football Association of the Czech Republic
 Top-level league: Czech First League
 UEFA ranking: 13th
 Soccerway profile: here

Clubs and locations as of 2021–22 season:

Denmark

 Country: Denmark
 Football association: Danish Football Association
 Top-level league: Danish Superliga
 UEFA ranking: 14th
 Soccerway profile: here

Clubs and locations as of 2020–21 season:

England

 Country: England
 Football association: The Football Association
 Top-level league: Premier League
 UEFA ranking: 2nd
 Soccerway profile: here

Founded in 1888, the Football League was the world's first national football league. The inaugural competition was won by Preston North End, who remained unbeaten throughout the entire season. It was the top level football league in England from its foundation until 1992, when the 22 clubs comprising the First Division resigned from the Football League to form the new FA Premier League. As of the 2019–20 season the Premier League comprises 20 clubs; each team plays every other team twice, with the bottom 3 clubs at the end of the season relegated to the EFL Championship. The most successful domestic club is Manchester United, who have won the league 20 times, while the most successful English club in Europe is Liverpool, who have won 6 European Cups, 3 UEFA Cups and 4 UEFA Super Cups, more than any other English team.

Clubs and locations as of 2020–21 season:

Estonia

 Country: Estonia
 Football association: Estonian Football Association
 Top-level league: Estonian Premier Division
 UEFA ranking: 51st
 Soccerway profile: here

An independent Estonian league took place between 1921 and 1940. However, after the Second World War it became part of the Soviet Union, and became a regional system. Estonia regained independence after the dissolution of the USSR, organising the first national championship in 52 years in 1992, the same year that the Estonian Football Association joined UEFA. FC Flora is the most successful team in the modern era, with 11 league titles as of the end of the 2018 season. Since 2005, the Premier Division has consisted of 10 teams, which play one another four times. At the end of the season the bottom team is relegated to the second level of Estonian football, while the ninth-placed team enters into a relegation playoff.

Clubs and locations as of 2021 season:

Faroe Islands

 Country: Faroe Islands
 Football association: Faroe Islands Football Association
 Top-level league: Faroe Islands Premier League
 UEFA ranking: 53rd
 Soccerway profile: here

The Faroe Islands are a constituent country of the Kingdom of Denmark, which also comprises Greenland and Denmark itself. The league was formed in 1942, and has been contested annually since, with the exception of 1944 due to a lack of available balls. The Faroe Islands gained UEFA recognition in 1992. The most successful teams are HB and KI, with 23 and 17 Premier League titles respectively as of the most recently completed 2018 season. Since the 1988 season, the Premier League has consisted of 10 teams. They play each other three times, with the bottom two teams relegated to the First Division.

Clubs and locations as of 2021 season:

Finland

 Country: Finland
 Football association: Football Association of Finland
 Top-level league: Finnish Premier League
 UEFA ranking: 43rd
 Soccerway profile: here

Finland's current league has been contested annually since 1898, with the exceptions of 1914 and 1943. The most successful team are HJK with 29 titles; as of 2018, no other team has won 10 or more. However, between 1920 and 1948 a rival championship operated, organised by the Finnish Workers' Sports Federation. Frequent champions in that competition before it came under the jurisdiction of the Football Association of Finland included Kullervo Helsinki, Vesa Helsinki and Tampereen Pallo-Veikot. The Premier League consists of 12 teams. Since 2019 season teams play one another two times, then the top 6 teams play the championship round, and the bottom 6 the relegation round. At the end of the season the bottom club is relegated to the First Division, and the second-last club contests a in a play-off with the 2nd team of the First Division.

Clubs and locations as of 2021 season:

France

 Country: France
 Football association: French Football Federation
 Top-level league: Ligue 1
 UEFA ranking: 5th
 Soccerway profile: here

France's first football team—Le Havre AC—formed in 1872. The first French championship was first held in 1894, but only featured teams from the capital, Paris. Between 1896 and 1912, national championships were organised by several competing federations; the first universally recognised national championship took place in the 1912–13 season. However, it only lasted two seasons; from the outbreak of the First World War in 1914, French football operated on a regional basis until 1932. A national league resumed between 1932 and 1939, and has operated annually since the conclusion of the Second World War in 1945. Ligue 1 and its predecessors have featured 20 teams since the 1946–47 season. Each team plays the other nineteen sides home and away, and at the end of the season the bottom three teams are relegated to Ligue 2.  From  2023-24 season, the Ligue 1 will be reduced to 18 teams that means 4 teams will be relegated in the 2022-23 season. So far, Olympique de Marseille are the only French club to have won the UEFA Champions League, in 1993.

Clubs and locations as of 2020–21 season:

Georgia

 Country: Georgia
 Football association: Georgian Football Federation
 Top-level league: Georgian Premier League (Erovnuli Liga, literally "National League")
 UEFA ranking: 44th
 Soccerway profile: here

A Georgian football championship first took place in 1926, as part of the Soviet football system. The first independent championship took place in 1990, despite the fact that Georgia remained a Soviet state until 1991. Upon independence, Georgia subsequently joined UEFA and FIFA in 1992.

When Georgia organised its first independent championship, it operated with a spring-to-autumn season contained entirely within a calendar year. After the 1991 championship, the country transitioned to an autumn-to-spring season spanning two calendar years. This format continued through the 2015–16 season, after which it returned to a spring-to-autumn format. This was accomplished by holding an abbreviated 2016 season in autumn; the transition was completed for the 2017 season. Before the most recent transition, 16 teams had competed in the top flight, but the league was reduced to 14 teams for the 2016 season, and was reduced further to 10 for 2017 and beyond.

Clubs and locations as of 2021 season:

Germany

 Country: Germany
 Football association: German Football Association
 Top-level league: Bundesliga
 UEFA ranking: 3rd
 Soccerway profile: here

The Bundesliga consists of 18 teams, who play each other twice, for a total of 34 matches. The teams finishing in 17th and 18th places are relegated directly to the 2. Bundesliga, while the team finishing in 16th place enters into a two-legged play-off with the team finishing 3rd in the lower division.

Clubs and locations as of 2020–21 season:

Gibraltar

 Country: Gibraltar
 Football association: Gibraltar Football Association
 Top-level league: Gibraltar Premier Division
 UEFA ranking: 49th
 Soccerway profile: here

The Gibraltar Football Association was founded in 1895, making it one of the ten oldest active football associations in the world. League football has been organized by the GFA since 1905. The first league season after Gibraltar were accepted as full members of UEFA was 2013–14, making qualification to the UEFA Champions League and UEFA Europa League possible since the 2014–15 season, provided the relevant club has received a UEFA licence. The Premier Division has consisted of 10 teams since the 2015–16 season. All league matches are held at Victoria Stadium.

Clubs as of 2019–20 season:

Greece

 Country: Greece
 Football association: Hellenic Football Federation
 Top-level league: Superleague Greece
 UEFA ranking: 20th
 Soccerway profile: here

Clubs and locations as of 2021–22 season:

Hungary

 Country: Hungary
 Football association: Hungarian Football Federation
 Top-level league: Hungarian National Championship
 UEFA ranking: 33rd
 Soccerway profile: here

Clubs and locations as of 2020–21 season:

Iceland

 Country: Iceland
 Football association: Football Association of Iceland
 Top-level league: Icelandic Premier Division
 UEFA ranking: 46th
 Soccerway profile: here

Clubs and locations as of 2019 season:

Israel

 Country: Israel
 Football association: Israel Football Association
 Top-level league: Israeli Premier League (Ligat HaAl, literally "Super League")
 UEFA ranking: 23rd
 Soccerway profile: here
Clubs and locations as of 2022–23 season:

Italy

 Country: Italy
 Football association: Federazione Italiana Giuoco Calcio
 Top-level league: Serie A (Series A)
 UEFA ranking: 4th
 Soccerway profile: here

Clubs and locations as of 2020-21 season:

Kazakhstan

 Country: Kazakhstan
 Football association: Football Union of Kazakhstan
 Top-level league: Kazakhstan Premier League (literally "Kazakhstan Professional Football League")
 UEFA ranking: 25th
 Soccerway profile: here

Clubs and locations as of 2019 season:

Kosovo

 Country: Kosovo
 Football association: Football Federation of Kosovo
 Top-level league: Kosovo Superliga
 UEFA ranking: 52nd
 Soccerway profile: here

Clubs and locations as of 2019–20 season:

Latvia

 Country: Latvia
 Football association: Latvian Football Federation
 Top-level league: Latvian Higher League
 UEFA ranking: 37th
 Soccerway profile: here

Clubs and locations as of 2021 season:

Lithuania

 Country: Lithuania
 Football association: Lithuanian Football Federation
 Top-level league: A League
 UEFA ranking (2019-2020): 35th
 Soccerway profile: here

Clubs as of 2019 season:

Luxembourg

 Country: Luxembourg
 Football association: Luxembourg Football Federation
 Top-level league: Luxembourg National Division
 UEFA ranking: 35th
 Soccerway profile: here

Clubs and locations as of 2020–21 season:

Malta

 Country: Malta
 Football association: Malta Football Association
 Top-level league: Maltese Premier League
 UEFA ranking: 45th
 Soccerway profile: here

Clubs as of 2020–21 season:

Moldova

 Country: Republic of Moldova
 Football association: Football Association of Moldova
 Top-level league: Moldovan National Division
 UEFA ranking: 41st
 Soccerway profile: here

Clubs and locations as of 2019 season:

Montenegro

 Country: Montenegro
 Football association: Football Association of Montenegro
 Top-level league: Montenegrin First League (Montenegrin: Prva crnogorska fudbalska liga)
 UEFA ranking: 50th
 Soccerway profile: here

Clubs and locations as of 2020–21 season:

Netherlands

 Country: Netherlands
 Football association: Royal Dutch Football Association
 Top-level league: Eredivisie (Honorary Division)
 UEFA ranking: 9th
 Soccerway profile: here

Clubs as of 2020–21 season:

North Macedonia

 Country: North Macedonia
 Football association: Football Federation of Macedonia
 Top-level league: Macedonian First Football League
 UEFA ranking: 39th
 Soccerway profile: here

Clubs as of 2020–21 season:

Northern Ireland

 Country: Northern Ireland
 Football association: Irish Football Association
 Top-level league: NIFL Premiership
 UEFA ranking: 41st
 Soccerway profile: here

Clubs and locations as of 2021-22 season:

 Derry City, a club from Northern Ireland, has competed in the Republic of Ireland's football league system, the League of Ireland, since 1985.

Norway

 Country: Norway
 Football association: Football Association of Norway (NFF)
 Top-level league: Eliteserien
 UEFA ranking: 22nd
 Soccerway profile: here

Clubs and locations as of 2021 season:

Poland

 Country: Poland
 Football association: Polish Football Association
 Top-level league: Ekstraklasa
 UEFA ranking: 28th
 Soccerway profile: here

Clubs and locations as of 2019–20 season:

Portugal

 Country: Portugal
 Football association: Portuguese Football Federation
 Top-level league: Primeira Liga (English: Premier League)
 UEFA ranking: 6th
 Soccerway profile: here

Clubs as of 2020–21 season:

Republic of Ireland

 Country: Republic of Ireland
 Football association: Football Association of Ireland
 Top-level league: League of Ireland Premier Division
 UEFA ranking: 40th
 Soccerway profile: here
Clubs and locations as of 2021 season:

Romania

 Country: Romania
 Football association: Romanian Football Federation
 Top-level league: Liga I
 UEFA ranking: 25th
 Soccerway profile: here

Clubs and locations as of 2022–23 season:

Russia

 Country: Russia
 Football association: Football Union of Russia
 Top-level league: Russian Football Premier League
 UEFA ranking: 7th
 Soccerway profile: here

Clubs as of 2020–21 season:

San Marino
 Country: San Marino
 Football association: San Marino Football Federation
 League: Sammarinese Football Championship
 UEFA ranking: 55th
 Soccerway profile: here

This is a complete list of football clubs in San Marino (as San Marino has only one level domestic amateur league), apart from San Marino Calcio, the only professional Sammarinese club, which as of 2019–20 competes in Serie D, the fourth level of the Italian football league system.

Clubs and locations as of 2019–20 season:

Because there is no promotion or relegation in the league, the same 15 teams compete in the league.

 S.P. Cailungo (Borgo Maggiore)
 S.S. Cosmos (Serravalle)
 F.C. Domagnano (Domagnano)
 S.C. Faetano (Faetano)
 F.C. Fiorentino (Fiorentino)
 S.S. Folgore Falciano Calcio (Serravalle)
 A.C. Juvenes/Dogana (Serravalle)
 S.P. La Fiorita (Montegiardino)
 A.C. Libertas (Borgo Maggiore)
 S.S. Murata (San Marino)
 S.S. Pennarossa (Chiesanuova)
 S.S. San Giovanni (Borgo Maggiore)
 S.P. Tre Fiori (Fiorentino)
 S.P. Tre Penne (Serravalle)
 S.S. Virtus (Acquaviva)

Scotland

 Country: Scotland
 Football association: Scottish Football Association
 Top-level league: Scottish Premiership
 UEFA ranking: 19th
 Soccerway profile: here

Clubs and locations as of 2020–21 season:

Serbia

 Country: Serbia
 Football association: Football Association of Serbia
 Top-level league: Serbian SuperLiga
 UEFA ranking: 17th
 Soccerway profile: here

Clubs as of 2020–21 season:

Slovakia

 Country: Slovakia
 Football association: Slovak Football Association
 Top-level league: Slovak Super Liga
 UEFA ranking: 29th
 Soccerway profile: here

Clubs and locations as of 2020–21 season:

Slovenia

 Country: Slovenia
 Football association: Football Association of Slovenia
 Top-level league: Slovenian PrvaLiga (literally "First Slovenian Football League")
 UEFA ranking: 32nd
 Soccerway profile: here

Clubs and locations as of 2020–21 season:

Spain

 Country: Spain
 Football association: Royal Spanish Football Federation
 Top-level league: La Liga
 UEFA ranking: 1st
 Soccerway profile: here

Clubs and locations as of 2019–20 season:

Sweden

 Country: Sweden
 Football association: Swedish Football Association
 Top-level league: Allsvenskan (The All-Swedish)
 UEFA ranking: 22nd
 Soccerway profile: here

A Swedish championship was first organised in 1896, and the champions were decided by a knockout cup format until 1925, when Allsvenskan was formed. Sweden was one of the founding members of UEFA in 1954. As of the most recently completed 2018 season, Malmö FF have won the most national titles with 20, followed by IFK Göteborg with 18 and IFK Norrköping with 13. Malmö also have the most league titles, with 23 to 13 for both IFK Götebörg and IFK Norrköping. Since 2008, Allsvenskan has featured 16 teams. They each play one another home and away, for a total of 30 games. The bottom two teams are relegated to the Superettan (The Super One), and the 14th-placed Allsvenskan team enters into a relegation playoff with the 3rd-placed Superettan team to decide which will play in Allsvenskan for the following season.

Clubs and locations as of 2021 season:

Switzerland

 Country: Switzerland
 Football association: Swiss Football Association
 Top-level league: Swiss Super League
 UEFA ranking: 20th
 Soccerway profile: here

Clubs and locations as of 2020–21 season:

Turkey

 Country: Turkey
 Football association: Turkish Football Federation
 Top-level league: Süper Lig (English: Super League)
 UEFA ranking: 11th
 Soccerway profile: here

Turkish football operated on a regional basis until the 1950s. A national knockout tournament took place in 1957 and 1958, to decide European qualification. The Turkish Football Federation retrospectively recognised these tournaments as deciding the Turkish champions; both competitions were won by Beşiktaş. A national league was formed in 1959, and has been held annually from then onwards. Since the formation of a national league, the most successful teams are Galatasaray and Fenerbahçe, with 22 and 19 league titles respectively, as of the most recently completed 2018–19 season. Currently, 18 teams compete in the Süper Lig. Each team plays the other teams home and away, with the bottom three teams relegated to the TFF First League for the following season.

Clubs as of 2020–21 season:

Ukraine

 Country: Ukraine
 Football association: Football Federation of Ukraine
 Top-level league: Ukrainian Premier League
 UEFA ranking: 10th
 Soccerway profile: here

As a member of the Soviet Union, Ukraine's league operated as a feeder to the national Soviet leagues, meaning that until 1992 the strongest Ukrainian teams did not take part. The Football Federation of Ukraine was formed shortly after the country achieved independence in 1991, and gained UEFA membership the following year. Since the formation of a national league, Dynamo Kyiv have won 15 titles, Shakhtar Donetsk 12, and Tavriya Simferopol one, as of the most recently completed 2018–19 season.

Through the 2013–14 season, 16 teams participated in the Premier League. However, during that season's winter break, the Euromaidan protests began, soon followed by Russia's annexation of the Crimean peninsula and the still-ongoing war in the country's east. These developments led to the league dropping to 14 teams in 2014–15 and 12 in 2016–17.

Beginning with the 2016–17 season, the league season is divided into two stages. In the first stage, the teams play one another home and away, after which the league splits into two groups, each playing a home-and-away schedule within the group and with table points carrying over intact. The top six teams play to determine the league champion and European qualifying spots, while the bottom six teams play to avoid relegation, with the bottom two at the end of the second stage dropping to the Ukrainian First League.

Clubs and locations as of 2020–21 season:

Wales

 Country: Wales
 Football association: Football Association of Wales
 Top-level league: Cymru Premier
 UEFA ranking: 50th
 Soccerway profile: here

Although Wales joined UEFA in 1954, Welsh football operated on a regional basis until 1992, with no national championship. Five Welsh clubs play not in the Welsh football league system, but in the English football league system. Currently, there are no Welsh clubs competing in the Premier League. Welsh club Swansea City was relegated to the second level, the EFL Championship, at the end of the 2017–18 season, while Cardiff City were relegated following the 2018–19 season. Three other Welsh clubs participate lower down the English football league system: Newport County, Wrexham, and Merthyr Town. Despite competing in Football Association competitions, the latter three are under the jurisdiction of the Football Association of Wales. Until 2011 Swansea City and Cardiff City had similar arrangements with the FAW but are now under the jurisdiction of The Football Association. The most successful Welsh club since the formation of the Welsh Premier League is The New Saints, with 13 league titles after having clinched their eighth straight league crown in 2018–19. Since the 2010–11 season, the Welsh Premier League has featured 12 teams. Relegation to and promotion from lower regional leagues is in part dictated by whether or not clubs can obtain a Premier League licence; only clubs able to obtain a licence are eligible for promotion, and clubs which fail to obtain one are relegated regardless of their final league position.

Clubs and locations as of 2021-22 season:

See also
List of top-division football clubs in AFC countries
List of top-division football clubs in CAF countries
List of top-division football clubs in CONCACAF countries
List of top-division football clubs in CONMEBOL countries
List of top-division football clubs in OFC countries
List of top-division football clubs in non-FIFA countries
List of second division football clubs in UEFA countries
List of second division football clubs in AFC countries
Domestic football champions

Notes

References

+UEFA

Association football in Europe